The 2009–10 Ohio Bobcats women's basketball team represented Ohio University during the 2009–10 NCAA Division I women's basketball season. The Bobcats, led by second year head coach Semeka Randall, played their home games at the Convocation Center in Athens, Ohio as a member of the Mid-American Conference. They finished the season 8–22 and 4–12 in MAC play.

Preseason
The preseason poll was announced by the league office on October 28, 2009. Ohio was picked fifth in the MAC East.

Preseason women's basketball poll
(First place votes in parenthesis)

East Division
  (22)
  (12)
  (2)
 
 Ohio

West Division
  (18)
  (14)
  (4)

Tournament champs
Bowling Green

Preseason All-MAC

Schedule

|-
!colspan=9 style=| Non-conference regular season

|-

|-

|-
!colspan=9 style=| MAC regular season

|-
!colspan=9 style=| MAC Tournament

|-

Awards and honors

All-MAC Awards

References

Ohio
Ohio Bobcats women's basketball seasons
Ohio Bobcats women's basketball
Ohio Bobcats women's basketball